Simon Says is a children's game.  

Simon Says may also refer to:

Electronic games 
Simon (game), an electronic game, often referred to as Simon Says
Simon Says, a game made for the Magnavox Odyssey on game card 2, alongside Ski, Fun Zoo, and Percepts

Music 
Simon Says (band), a Californian band
Simon Says (album), an album by 1910 Fruitgum Company
"Simon Says" (1910 Fruitgum Company song), a song on the album
"Simon Says" (Laleh song)
"Simon Says" (Pharoahe Monch song)
"Simon Says", a song by Drain STH from their album Freaks of Nature
"Simon Says", a song by NCT 127 from their repackaged album Regulate

Film and television 

Simon Sez, a 1999 action film starring Dennis Rodman
Simon Says (film), a 2006 horror film
"Simon Says" (The Outer Limits), the 2000th episode of The Outer Limits
Simon Says, a 1971 unsold gameshow pilot starring Bob Barker
"Simon Says", 21st episode of the fifth season of Cheers notable for a guest appearance by John Cleese
"Simon Says", 7th episode of the first season of Almost Human
"Simon Says!", a 1988 episode of The Raccoons
"Simon Says", a 2013 episode of Sesame Street